Georgian Bay District SS ("GBDSS") is a Public high school in Midland, Simcoe County, in Central Ontario, Canada. Students attend from Midland/Penetanguishene and surrounding areas including Hillsdale, Port McNicoll, Waubaushene, Victoria Harbour, Honey Harbour, Wyevale and Christian Island. The principal is Hailey McLean and Vice principals are Ed Baker & Ashley Knight. 
GBDSS offers open, applied and academic courses in Grade 9 through 12, a Life Skills program and two off-site Alternative Learning Programs, one with a focus on Native culture. GBDSS offers e-learning courses in addition to regular classes. All school programs focused on academics, co-curricular, and community involvement. Each semester approximately 175 honour students were recognized.

In 2014, an announcement was made to amalgamate Midland SS and Penetanguishene SS. This decision was made due to the declining enrollment of both schools. PSS closed at the end of the 2015–16 school year, its 350 students joined the 500 students at the existing MSS building, which can accommodate up to 1,400 students, while construction of the new school takes place. Construction  began in the spring of 2016, and was expected to be complete and opening in September 2018, however, in July of that year it was announced that it would not be ready. A new completion date was not provided. February 4, 2019 was the first day for students in the new GBDSS building.

Students at the school are involved in Student Council initiatives; international student exchanges; co-curricular programs associated with music, art, and drama; a variety of special interest clubs; and athletics.

GBDSS is located in area "A" of the school board, the superintendent is Susan Sidlofsky.

Notable alumni
 George Dudley, inductee of the Hockey Hall of Fame and Canadian Amateur Hockey Association executive
 Jack Hendrickson, National Hockey League player, three-time inductee to Midland, Ontario Sports Hall of Fame

See also
List of high schools in Ontario
Simcoe Muskoka Catholic District School Board

References

External links

High schools in Simcoe County
Educational institutions established in 1904
1904 establishments in Ontario
Midland, Ontario